Tahj Morgan (born July 27, 1996), professionally known as jetsonmade (stylized in all lowercase), is an American record producer, songwriter and record executive. He has been noted as a pioneer of the growing rap scene in South Carolina and North Carolina. He has produced many hit songs, with the most notable being "Suge" and "Bop" by American rapper DaBaby and "Whats Poppin" by Jack Harlow. He is also noted for his popular producer tag, "Oh Lord, Jetson made another one!".

Early life 
Tahj Morgan was born on July 27, 1996 in Columbia, South Carolina. He graduated from Richland Northeast High School in 2014. He then went to college for two semesters, but dropped out.

Career 
Morgan earned his first production placement on 21 Savage's 2015 mixtape The Slaughter King, on the track "Slime" with Young Nudy.

In March 2019, Morgan produced DaBaby's hit single "Suge", which peaked at number seven on the Billboard Hot 100. Shortly after, he signed a publishing deal with Sony/ATV Music Publishing. He later on produced other hit singles, such as "Bop" by DaBaby and "Start wit Me" by Roddy Ricch and Gunna, both of which charted on the Billboard Hot 100. He also was at the Dreamville recording sessions.

Going into 2020, Morgan produced Jack Harlow's breakout single "Whats Poppin", which peaked at number two on the Billboard Hot 100, making it Harlow's first Hot 100 hit, and was certified Platinum by the RIAA. He also earned his first two Grammy nominations for his work on DaBaby's "Suge".

In August 2020 he became the first person to curate the music for XXLs 2020 Freshman Class.

Other ventures 
Morgan founded the record label BoyMeetSpace in Mid 2019. Its artists included the late rapper 18veno, while its record producers include 1st Class, Neeko Baby, Psilo, XenoKrazy, Kaycxs, Philly, Alioop, Its2Ezzy, Deskhop, and the label's latest addition, Jee.

Controversy 
In July 2020, it was revealed that Morgan was allegedly selling one of American rapper Playboi Carti's unreleased songs for $17,000, whom he previously worked with on his song "@ MEH". He has since denied this claim, explaining that he was "trolling".

Discography

Studio albums

Collaborative albums

Singles

Other charted songs

Production discography

Charted singles

Other charted songs

Production credits

Awards and nominations 

!
|-
|align=center|2020
|"Suge"
|Grammy Award for Best Rap Song
|
|

Notes

References

External links 

 
 

Living people
People from South Carolina
American hip hop record producers
1996 births